Barotac Nuevo, officially the Municipality of Barotac Nuevo, is a 2nd class municipality in the province of Iloilo, Philippines. According to the 2020 census, it has a population of 58,176 people.

The town is officially known as the Football Capital of the Philippines.

History 

According to local folklore, the barrio of Malutac in Dumangas was famous for its well-bred horses. There was once a horse called Tamasak, a pure white stallion in the stead of one Don Simon Protacio. Don Protacio was offered to sell the horse to Manuel Gonzales de Aguilar, the governor-general of the Philippines at that time whose white horse previously died. Don Protacio adamantly refused to sell his horse which led to Gonzales de Aguilar personally visiting Don Protacio's compound in order to persuade him to do so. After a long negotiation, they came to a truce wherein Tamasak will be given to the governor-general in exchange for Malutac to be made into a town. When the barrio was eventually separated from Dumangas and became a town, it was renamed into Barotac Nuevo.

The name "Barotac" is from the Spanish word "baro", which means mud, as well as the second syllables of the Hiligaynon word, "lutac" which also means mud. "Nuevo", which translates to new, was added to the name to distinguish it from another town called Barotac Viejo located just north.

Barotac Nuevo is a small town whose main industry and capital are in fishing and agriculture. The town church was built by Spanish Roman Catholic missionaries in the 16th century.

Geography 
The town is bordered by Pototan to the west, Dingle to the north-west, Anilao to the north-east, and Dumangas to the south.

Barangays 
Barotac Nuevo is politically subdivided into 29 barangays:

Climate

Demographics

The primary language spoken in Barotac Nuevo is Hiligaynon, also known as Ilonggo, and the population is predominantly Roman Catholic.

Economy 

The town's agricultural output includes rice, sugar cane, and spinach. Marine products such as milkfish and tilapia are harvested from local fisheries. There are usually three annual rice harvests, depending on the season.

Sports 
Football is popular in Barotac Nuevo which is usually dubbed as the football capital town of the Philippines. A football field is present in the town plaza. Every summer season, a local football league is held. Stallion F.C., now named Stallion Laguna F.C. of the Philippines Football League, was founded in Barotac Nuevo. There is only one basketball court in town and is rarely used.

Telecommunications 
Smart Communications has a cell site in the middle of the town providing voice, texting and data services over the GSM network. Smart is likewise providing 4G LTE, 3G and HSPA services. SmartBRO is also available for fixed internet service. There are also cell sites located at Barangay Tiwi.

Notable personalities

 Myrtle Sarrosa, Pinoy Big Brother: Teen Edition 4 Big Winner
 Chieffy Caligdong, former Philippines National Football Team midfielder
 Ian Araneta,  former Philippines National Football Team
 Jovin Bedic, Philippines National Football Team
 Elmer Bedia,  former Philippines National Football Team, PFF Mr. Football

References

External links 

 [ Philippine Standard Geographic Code]
 Philippine Census Information
 Local Governance Performance Management System

Municipalities of Iloilo